Edward Erie Poor, Sr. (February 5, 1837 – July 29, 1900) was an American banker. He served as Vice-President and then President of the National Park Bank from 1895-1900, succeeding Ebenezer K. Wright and followed by Richard Delafield. Born in Boston, Poor was an advocate of the gold standard during the free silver debate of the late 1890s.

References

1837 births
1900 deaths
American bankers
19th-century American businesspeople